"Reservations for Two" is a duet by American singers Dionne Warwick and Kashif. It was written by Tena Clark, Nathan East, and Gary Prim for Warwick's 1987 album of the same name. Production was helmed by Kashif; "Reservations for Two" later also appeared on his fourth studio album Love Changes (1987). The ballad was released as the second single from Warwick's album in 1987, and peaked at number 62 on the US Billboard Hot 100.

Track listings

Credits and personnel
Credits lifted from the liner notes of Friends .

Tena Clark – writer
Nathan East – writer
Darrell Gustamachio – engineer, mixing
Kashif – arranger, producer, vocals
Gary Prim – writer
Dionne Warwick – vocals

Charts

References

1980s ballads
1987 singles
Dionne Warwick songs
1987 songs
Arista Records singles